Istrianis is a genus of moths in the family Gelechiidae.

Species
 Istrianis brucinella (Mann, 1872)
 Istrianis crauropa Meyrick, 1918
 Istrianis femoralis (Staudinger, 1876)
 Istrianis fynbosella Bidzilya & Mey, 2011
 Istrianis myricariella (Frey, 1870)
 Istrianis nigrosquamella (Amsel, 1959)
 Istrianis squamodorella (Amsel, 1935)
 Istrianis steganotricha (Meyrick, 1935)
 Istrianis wachtlii (Rogenhofer, 1881)

References

 
Litini
Moth genera